Galeyville is a populated place situated in Cochise County, Arizona, United States. Founded in 1881, it is now a ghost town.

References

External links
 Galeyvile – ghosttowns.com
 Galeyville – Ghost Town of the Month at azghosttowns.com

Populated places in Cochise County, Arizona
Ghost towns in Arizona